Jorge Ernesto Trezeguet (born 13 May 1951) is an Argentine former professional footballer who played as a defender. He is the father of David Trezeguet.

Career
Trezeguet played for Estudiantes (BA), Almagro, Deportivo Español, Sportivo Italiano, El Porvenir and Chacarita Juniors in Argentina, as well as FC Rouen in France. It was while playing for Rouen that his son David was born.

He was provisionally banned for failing a doping control in 1974 while playing for Estudiantes (BA) in the second-tier Primera B Nacional along with two teammates. He was subsequently pardoned, but his career was adversely impacted by the allegations.

Trezeguet later in his career worked as a physical trainer. Currently he is the agent for his son David as well as a European scout for Juventus.

References

1951 births
Living people
Argentine footballers
Argentine people of French descent
FC Rouen players
Deportivo Español footballers
Estudiantes de Buenos Aires footballers
Club Almagro players
Chacarita Juniors footballers
Ligue 1 players
Sportivo Italiano footballers
El Porvenir footballers
Association football defenders
Argentine expatriate footballers
Argentine expatriate sportspeople in France
Expatriate footballers in France
Juventus F.C. non-playing staff